Tapi Chanakya (1925–1973), professionally known as Chanakya, was an Indian film director and writer. He is son of the famous writer Tapi Dharma Rao Naidu. He has worked as Radio Telegraphist for the Indian Army.

Filmography
 Palletoori Pilla (Telugu) (1950) (assistant director)
 Anta Manavalle (1954)
 Rojulu Marayi (Telugu) (1955) (director and screen adaptation)
 Peddarikalu (1957)
 Ettuku Pai Ettu (1958)
 Bhagya Devatha (1959)
 Jalsarayudu (1960)
 Kumkumarekha (1960)
 Pudhiya Pathai (1960)
 Kalasivunte Kaladu Sukham (1961)
 Constable Koothuru (1963)
 Ramudu Bheemudu in Telugu (1964)
 Varasatwam (1964)
 C.I.D. (1965)
 Enga Veetu Penn (1965)
 Enga Veettu Pillai (1965)
 Adugu Jaadalu (1966)
 Naan Aanaiyittal (1966)
 Ram Aur Shyam (Hindi) (1967)
 Oli Vilakku (1968)
 Pudhiya Boomi (1968)
 Madhavi (1969)
 Vidhi Vilasam (1970)
 Bangaru Talli (1971)
 Bikhre Moti (Hindi) (1971)
 Man Mandir (Hindi) (1971)
 Bandhipotu Bhayankara (1972)
 Jaanwar Aur Insaan (Hindi) (1972)
 Manavata (Hindi) (1972)
 Subha-O-Sham (Hindi & Persian) (1972)
 Ganga Manga (Telugu) (1973)

External links
 

Telugu film directors
1925 births
1973 deaths
20th-century Indian film directors
Hindi-language film directors